Ariella  is a genus of minute sea snails, marine gastropod mollusks or micromollusks in the family Scissurellidae, the little slit snails.

Species
Species within the genus Ariella  include:
  † Ariella haliotimorpha Bandel, 1998

Species brought into synonymy
 Ariella campbelli Bandel, 1998: synonym of Sinezona levigata (Iredale, 1908)
 Ariella lacuniformis (Watson, 1886): synonym of Macromphalina lacuniformis (Watson, 1886) (species inquirenda)
 Ariella pauperata (Powell, 1933): synonym of Sinezona pauperata Powell, 1933
 Ariella subantarctica (Hedley, 1916): synonym of Sinezona subantarctica (Hedley, 1916)

References

 Geiger D.L. (2003) Phylogenetic assessment of characters proposed for the generic classification of Recent Scissurellidae (Gastropoda: Vetigastropoda) with a description of one new genus and six new species from Easter Island and Australia. Molluscan Research 23: 21-83
 Geiger D.L. (2012) Monograph of the little slit shells. Volume 1. Introduction, Scissurellidae. pp. 1-728. Volume 2. Anatomidae, Larocheidae, Depressizonidae, Sutilizonidae, Temnocinclidae. pp. 729–1291. Santa Barbara Museum of Natural History Monographs Number 7

Scissurellidae